The enzyme fructose-2,6-bisphosphate 6-phosphatase (EC 3.1.3.54) catalyzes the reaction

β-D-fructose 2,6-bisphosphate + H2O  β-D-fructofuranose 2-phosphate + phosphate

This enzyme belongs to the family of hydrolases, specifically those acting on phosphoric monoester bonds.  The systematic name of this enzyme class is β-D-fructose-2,6-bisphosphate 6-phosphohydrolase. Other names in common use include fructose 2,6-bisphosphate-6-phosphohydrolase, fructose-2,6-bisphosphate 6-phosphohydrolase, and D-fructose-2,6-bisphosphate 6-phosphohydrolase.  This enzyme participates in fructose and mannose metabolism.

References

 
 

EC 3.1.3
Enzymes of unknown structure